Several vessels have been named British Hero:

 was launched in North Shields. A French privateer captured her in January or February 1806.
 was launched at Jarrow. She initially was a government transport and so did not appear in Lloyd's Register or the Register of Shipping until she came into mercantile service c. 1813. She was lost in November 1816 on a voyage to India.

Ship names